In the technological theory of social production, the growth of output, measured  in money units, is related to achievements in technological consumption of labour and energy.  This theory is based on concepts of classical political economy and neo-classical economics and appears to be a generalisation of the known economic models, such as the neo-classical model of economic growth and input-output model.

The main relations of the theory

In classical political economy (Smith, Marx, Ricardo),  it is human efforts (labour) , which are measured in working hours. Neoclassical practice  adds  capital , which is a money estimate of production equipment, that is value of  the collection of all energy-conversion machines and information processing equipment, plus ancillary structures to contain and move them, including residential housing, when one considers capital in a wider sense. The  earliest theories assumed, that  output  can be considered a function of labour  and capital ,  as creative factors of production, 

This relation formalised the concept of neo-classical political economy about substitution of labour by capital. There can be different realisation of the above function. The next important step to the understanding of economic growth was done in the middle of the past century. To incorporate into the theory technological progress, which is believed is ultimately the source of economic growth in developed countries in recent centuries, it was suggested  to modify concepts of arguments  in the production function and consider them to be not capital and expenditures of labour, but  services of the capital  and work , so that

In other words, an extra  time dependence of the production function (so called exogenous technological progress)  has to be  assumed. This approach describes the empirical data by use of the two production factors and some empirical quantity called total factor productivity. Suggesting that capital service   can be considered as an independent variable, whereas labour service   is regarded just as labour, one came to the formulation of technological theory, in which, taking also capital stock    into account, production of value  can be considered  as a function of the three production factors

This function can also be compared with the previous equation, in which  capital as variable played two distinctive roles:  capital stock as value of production equipment and capital service as a substitute of labour. The only thing which is done is a separation of the two roles of capital: we consider capital stock   to be the  means of attracting  labour  and capital service , to the production. It was shown also that capital service ,  as one of the three factors of production, has a meaning of substitutive work of production equipment  (energy delivered to animate production equipment). The theory was considered in one sector an approximation of the production system, including some reference to multi-sector approach.

Dynamics of production factors

The expansion of production, characterised by changes of the accumulated value , requires additional labour  and substitutive work , so that dynamics of  the production factors can be written  as the balance equations

The first terms in the right side of these relations  describe the increase in the quantities caused by gross investments  accumulated in a material form of production equipment.
 and 

The second terms on the right side of equations (1) reflect the decrease in the corresponding quantities due to the removal of a part of the production equipment from service with the depreciation coefficient  , which is taken equal for all factors due to assumption, that the technological characteristics of the equipment do not change after its installation, otherwise the dynamic equations takes a more complex form.

Production function

Production function, as function of independent variables: labour , capital  and substitutive work ,  have to satisfy some requirements, which help to determine its form. Taking into account that  substitutive work  and labour  inputs are substitutes to each other and  capital  has to be considered to be a complement to work ( and )  of the production equipment, the production function for our case can be specified as:

where  ,  and  correspond to output, labour and substitutive work in the base year. The index  is connected with  technological characteristics of production equipment

After differentiating of relations (2), one get the expression for the growth rate of output

The first terms in the right side of the equation represent a contribution to the growth rate of output of the growth rate of production factors: labor and substitution  work, the latter - a contribution due to changes in the production system directly.  The productivity of the capital stock  and the index  in equation (2) are parameters of the production system itself,  and their derivatives are related to each other and to the characteristics of production system as 

In the multi-sector approach (input-output model), changes in the technological index are related to aggregate sectoral technological change and to the difference in the growth rates across sectors.

This formulation offers two complementary descriptions of the production of value. The first line in equation (2) relates output to the amount of production equipment (capital stock) while the second describes the process of production through property of the same equipment to attract labour and energy (labour and substitutive work). The first line is analogous to the production technology found in the Harrod-Domar growth model, while the function in the second resembles the Cobb-Douglas production function.

Three modes of development

The real investments are determined by the assumption that the production system  tries to swallow up all available production factors. In any case the  rates of real growth do not exceed the  rates of potential growth, given as functions of time

so that, in virtue of  equations (1),  one ought to write for investments

The three lines of this relation define three modes of economic development, for which one has different formulae for calculation of the rates of real growth.  The first line in (5) is valid in the case of lack of investment, 
abundance of labour, energy  and raw materials. The second line is valid in the case of lack of labour, abundance of investment, energy  and raw materials. The last line of equations is valid in the case of lack of energy, 
abundance of investment, labour  and raw materials.

Dynamics of technological coefficients

Assuming also, that the technological coefficients have tendencies to change in such a way that the production system  tries to exploit all available production factors, in the first approximation, one  can get the equations for the technological coefficients

where   is time of crossover from one technological situation to another, when external parameters  and  change. It is determined by internal processes of attracting of the proper technology.

Implementations

The first quantity is connected with number of population, in fact, one can count that labour force is about half of the total number of population. The  availability of substitutive work is a more uncertain quantity. It is determined by fundamental results of science, by  research, by project works, and by materialisation of all human imagination about how to use energy instead of labour for production. The availability of production factors ought to be endogenous in a problem of evolution of human population, when dynamics of population and stock of knowledge are included into consideration.

Productivity of labour

The scientific and technical progress can be reduced to processes of introduction of innovations, that is consecutive replacement of instruments, materials, designs, adaptations and other objects with more perfect from this or that point of view. Among all processes of replacement, the outstanding role is played the process of replacement of alive work by work of machines with assistance of forces of the nature. Substitution of efforts with work of machines is unique process of replacement which influences the labor productivity as the ratio of value of output to expenditures of labour.  Productivity of labour  depends on the ratio of substitutive work to workers' efforts   and, according to (2), can be expressed as

Here, output should be measured in value units of constant purchasing capacity, that is, as one speaks, to represent a 'physical' measure of output.

The growth rate of labour productivity is expressed via four quantities as 

The labour requirement  appears to be the most important quantity, which determines the change of productivity of labour.  If , variations in technology do not occur, labor productivity is constant, and all increment of output is connected only with an increase in human's efforts. Human efforts are, certainly, the main motive power, but, under condition of  the workers' efforts partially are replaced with work of the machines movable by outer energy sources, and the labor productivity increases. This is a general description of influence of scientific and technological progress, which is naturally entered in a picture of progress of mankind.

Increase in labor productivity cannot be understood without taking into account the phenomenon accompanying progress of production - attraction of natural energy sources (animals, wind, water, coal, oil and others) for performance of works that replaces efforts of the humans in production. The developing of machine technologies appears to give increase, via effect of substitution, in labour productivity. A progressively greater amount of energy  is used by human societies via  improvements in technology.

Exponential growth

The theory can be applied to describe the 'stylised' facts of economic growth, that is, exponential growth of output and production factors.  In such, relatively calm  periods of development, the rates of growth of production factors can be considered to be constant, which gives, according to equation (1),  exponential growth of  production factors

To obtain an expression for output, one refers to relations (2) and (8), according to which,  the output can be written in  the following form

This relation describe a well known fact, that the growth rate of output is equal to the growth rate of capital.
The difference between the growth rates of capital and output seems to be quite unreliable, given the rough estimate of the parameters of the problem, though, at more detailed consideration, the difference can be  explained by distinction of the growth rates of sector outputs.

The rate of growth of output can be broken on two parts, while on the average a fraction of the rate  is connected with growth of expenditures of labour, and the  other part —with growth of substitutive work. The  theory predicts, that in the future, when  and  energy conversion efficiency approaches thermodynamic limits, the growth rate of output approaches to the growth rate of consumption of total amount of energy carrier multiplied by the technological coefficient . 

Though capital is the means of attracting the production factors  to production,  increase in consumption  of the production factors is connected with increase in capital. One can formally separate the growth rate of capital  in the growth rate of output to get the expression for conventional  Solow residual (total factor productivity) in neoclassical theory of economic growth as  
.

See also
Productivity improving technologies (historical)
Economic growth

References

External links 
 Pokrovskii, Vladimir N. (2011) Econodynamics. The Theory of Social Production, Springer, Dordrecht, Heidelberg et cetera.

Economic growth
Macroeconomics